The Human Adventure is a collection of French television documentaries about the distant cultures and worldwide historical sites. The first documentary aired on 4 January 1997 on the Franco-German TV channel Arte. In coproduction with Arte France and Trans Europe Film, in collaboration with Éditions Gallimard, the programme inaugurated the adaptation of the collection "Découvertes Gallimard" in the same year, telecast on Saturday evening at 8:45. Selected documentaries are available in English, for instance,  and The Mummies of Taklamakan.

Synopsis 
These documentaries use reenactments to tell the stories of past civilisations, looking for traces of ancient history of mankind and the scientific, technical and artistic discoveries that have shaped human history. Key players, periods and events in history are used to figure in the stories, from Maya empire, Mesopotamia to the exploration of Africa, from Ancient Egypt to the Taklamakan mummies, from Leonardo da Vinci, Louis the Sun King, Frederick the Great to Jean-François Champollion, etc., the series explores our planet, recounting mankind's achievements, development, lifestyles and religions. It also occasionally follows some spectacular scientific expeditions.

Home video 
The Human Adventure has been released on VHS and DVD by  since 2002. The DVD edition features an English audio track.

List of documentaries

References

External links 
 

French documentary films
French documentary television series
French-language television shows
1990s French television series
1997 French television series debuts
Découvertes Gallimard